Albacete is one of the five constituencies represented in the Cortes of Castilla–La Mancha, the regional legislature of the autonomous community of Castilla–La Mancha. The constituency currently elects six deputies. Its boundaries correspond to those of the Spanish province of Albacete. The electoral system uses the D'Hondt method and a closed-list proportional representation, with a minimum threshold of three percent.

Electoral system
The constituency was created as per the Statute of Autonomy of Castilla–La Mancha of 1982 and was first contested in the 1983 regional election. The Statute provided for the five provinces in Castilla–La Mancha—Albacete, Ciudad Real, Cuenca, Guadalajara and Toledo—to be established as multi-member districts in the Cortes of Castilla–La Mancha, with this regulation being maintained under the 1986 regional electoral law. Each constituency is entitled to an initial minimum of three seats, with the remaining 18—22 from 1986 to 1998—being distributed in proportion to their populations. In 1983 and from 1998 to 2014, each constituency was allocated a fixed number of seats: 9 for Albacete (10 from 1998 to 2014), 10 for Ciudad Real (11 from 1998 to 2012; 12 until 2014), 8 for Cuenca (8 from 2012 to 2014), 7 for Guadalajara (8 from 2007 to 2012; 9 until 2014) and 10 for Toledo (11 from 1998 to 2007; 12 from 2007 to 2012; 13 until 2014).

Voting is on the basis of universal suffrage, which comprises all nationals over eighteen, registered in Castilla–La Mancha and in full enjoyment of their political rights. Amendments to the electoral law in 2011 required for Castilian-Manchegan people abroad to apply for voting before being permitted to vote, a system known as "begged" or expat vote. Seats are elected using the D'Hondt method and a closed list proportional representation, with an electoral threshold of three percent of valid votes—which includes blank ballots—being applied in each constituency. The only exception was in 1983, when a five percent threshold was applied regionally. The use of the D'Hondt method might result in a higher effective threshold, depending on the district magnitude.

The electoral law allows for parties and federations registered in the interior ministry, coalitions and groupings of electors to present lists of candidates. Parties and federations intending to form a coalition ahead of an election are required to inform the relevant Electoral Commission within ten days of the election call—fifteen before 1985—whereas groupings of electors need to secure the signature of at least one percent of the electorate in the constituencies for which they seek election—one-thousandth of the electorate, with a compulsory minimum of 500 signatures, until 1985—disallowing electors from signing for more than one list of candidates.

Deputies

Elections

2019 regional election

2015 regional election

2011 regional election

2007 regional election

2003 regional election

1999 regional election

1995 regional election

1991 regional election

1987 regional election

1983 regional election

References

Cortes of Castilla–La Mancha constituencies
Province of Albacete
Constituencies established in 1983
1983 establishments in Spain